10 Minutes Gone is a 2019 crime thriller action film directed by Brian A. Miller. The film stars Bruce Willis and Michael Chiklis, and was released on September 27, 2019.

Plot
Expert bank robber Frank Sullivan (Michael Chiklis) never had a job go wrong – until his brother is killed during a heist. Knocked unconscious, Frank wakes up in a dirty alley without memory of how the robbery went awry or who shot his brother. To Frank's boss, violent crime lord Rex (Bruce Willis), none of that matters, he just wants the loot that Frank doesn't have. Short on time and information, Frank must figure out which member of their crew betrayed them, avoid Rex's contract killer closing in on him and locate a mysterious briefcase to save his own skin and avenge his brother's death.

Cast

Production
The film was shot in Cincinnati in September 2018.

Box office
As of August 27, 2022, 10 Minutes Gone grossed $332,731 in the United Arab Emirates, Portugal, Mexico, and Colombia.

Reception
On Rotten Tomatoes the film holds an approval rating of 0% based on nine reviews, with an average rating of 2/10. On Metacritic the film has a weighted average score of 15 out of 100, based on four critics, indicating "generally unfavorable reviews". Derek Smith of Slant Magazine awarded the film half a star out of four.

References

External links
 

2010s English-language films
2019 films
2019 crime action films
2019 action thriller films
2019 independent films
American action thriller films
American crime action films
American crime thriller films
Canadian crime thriller films
Canadian crime action films
Canadian action thriller films
American independent films
Lionsgate films
Canadian independent films
Films shot in Ohio
Films directed by Brian A. Miller
2010s American films
2010s Canadian films